Joseph Lewis (born January 23, 1936) is a former American football defensive tackle who played five seasons in the National Football League (NFL) for the Pittsburgh Steelers, Baltimore Colts, and Philadelphia Eagles. He played college football for Compton Junior College and was a seventeenth round draft selection by the Steelers in 1958.

A native of Los Angeles, Lewis attended David Starr Jordan High School before playing college football at Compton Junior College. After his graduation from college, Lewis was selected in the seventeenth round (199th overall) of the 1958 NFL Draft by the Pittsburgh Steelers. Lewis appeared in 58 total games in his career, starting 31, and recorded 3.5 unofficial sacks. He also scored one touchdown in 1960 on a fumble return.

References

1936 births
Living people
Players of American football from Los Angeles
American football defensive tackles
Compton Tartars football players
Pittsburgh Steelers players
Baltimore Colts players
Philadelphia Eagles players